Pobeda is a rural locality on Karelian Isthmus, in Vyborgsky District of Leningrad Oblast, served by the station Kanneljärvi of the Saint Petersburg–Vyborg railroad. Until the Winter War and Continuation War, it had been the administrative center of the Kanneljärvi municipality of the Viipuri province of Finland. 

Rural localities in Leningrad Oblast
Karelian Isthmus